Brigadier Michael John Stone is a retired British Army officer, former Director of Information of the British Army and former chief information officer of the Ministry of Defence. He is currently the Global Head of Government Technology Transformation at KPMG. In 2015, Stone made the UKtech50, where he was ranked the 12th most influential person in the UK IT Sector.

Stone was commissioned into the Duke of Wellington's Regiment in 1976, and his first tour of duty was in Northern Ireland as a platoon commander. This was followed by tours in Germany, Cyprus, Gibraltar, Kenya, Norway, Canada and the United States throughout his 26-year military career. In 2002, Stone retired from the army and joined BT Group at director level. Three years later he was appointed chief operating officer of BT International, then further promoted to President of Service Design and CIO of BT Global Services. Stone remained in the telecoms industry until 2012, when he led a serco bid to secure the £36million DBS contract being outsourced by the MoD. In March 2012, it was confirmed the bid had succeeded and Stone was subsequently appointed CEO of Defence Business Services. On 2 May 2014, it was announced that Stone was to be taking over from Yvonne Ferguson as CIO of the MoD.

Early life and education 

Stone is the eldest son of John Stone (a descendant of the Rowntree family) and Miriam Stone (née Payne). His father was an engineer, who worked internationally, meaning Stone spent his childhood living in multiple places. Due to this fact, Stone attended many schools, however the school he spent longest at was the King George V School (Hong Kong) whilst his father was commissioned to build the Cross-Harbour Tunnel in Hong Kong.

In 1972, Stone attended the University of Leeds and graduated with a BA (Hons) in Business Studies.
During his years in the army, Stone continued to study. In 1996, he received a Masters in Business Administration (MBA) followed a year later by a Masters (MSc) in Design of Information Systems from Cranfield University

Military career 

In 1976, having graduated from university, Stone trained at the Royal Military Academy Sandhurst and was subsequently commissioned into the Duke of Wellington's Regiment. His first tour of duty was in Northern Ireland as a platoon commander. His early career involved tours in Germany, Cyprus, Gibraltar, Kenya, Norway, Canada and the United States including Command tours as Chief of Staff of an Armoured Brigade and Head of the Tactics Division of the United States Army Infantry School. Towards the latter half of his military career, Stone began to specialise in the provision of information and technologies culminating first in his appointment as IT Director for the Field HQ of the Army, followed by his promotion to the rank of Brigadier and the position of Director of Information for the British Army.

Telecoms 
Having retired from the British Army in 2002, Stone joined BT Group where he was made Director of Stepchange, tasked with leading the BT Government change agenda. After eight months however, Stone was asked by BT Retail to set up and become CEO of a corporate venture to exploit information management opportunities in the public sector. In 2005, he was appointed CEO of BT International, then further promoted, in 2007, to President of Service Design and CIO of BT Global Services.

In 2009, Stone was offered the role of Vice President & Chief Client Officer of Mastek, an Indian telecoms company, which he held until the end of 2010.

Civil service 
In 2012, Stone led a serco bid to secure the £36million DBS contract being outsourced by the MoD. It was confirmed the bid had succeeded in March 2012, and Stone was subsequently appointed CEO of Defence Business Services (DBS). As of 1 April 2014, the Service Personnel and Veterans Agency merged with Defence Business Services. The merger came as a direct result of Lord Levene's Defence Reform report published in 2011. This meant that DBS was now responsible for the administration and delivery of all Armed Forces Pension and Compensation Schemes, including the War Pension Scheme.
On 2 May 2014, it was announced that Stone was to take over from Yvonne Ferguson as CIO of the MoD after the Guardian revealed that the Government was paying her £2,000 a day at a time of cost-cutting that had already led to 50,000 civilian and military jobs being axed. It is unknown how much Stone himself earns.
After questions were asked about potential conflicts of interest, the MoD prepared a statement saying "Mike Stone's employment is covered by clear conflict of interest provisions and his objectives are all set by the MoD". Jean Louis Bravard, former global CIO at JP Morgan, who is now senior advisor in the IT services sector said it makes sense for the MoD to choose somebody who understands the supplier market. "I understand the perception of a conflict of interest, but if you find somebody with absolutely no conflict of interest they probably can’t do the job."

Stone led the ISS organisation within Joint Forces Command and was the MoD CDIO from May 2014 up until he announced his intentions to resign effective March 2017. Of his departure, Andy Johnston, head of defence programme at techUK, said, "In his role as CDIO Mike Stone has been a visionary and disruptive force in MOD. techUK members have benefitted from his and his team’s open and proactive approach to industry engagement and he has a fostered a vastly improved relationship with industry.

Return to private sector 
18 April 2017 it was announced that Stone was to be joining the auditing and advisory giant KPMG as the new Global Head of Government Technology Transformation.

Personal life 
In 1988, Stone married Louise FitzRoy-Stone MBE (née Stewart-FitzRoy). He has three children by the name of Lucy, Alexandra and Maxallan (the eldest, Lucy, from a former marriage).

References 

1953 births
Living people
People from Burton upon Trent
Alumni of King George V School, Hong Kong
Alumni of the University of Leeds
Alumni of Cranfield University
Duke of Wellington's Regiment officers
British Telecom people
KPMG people
English chief executives
Chief operating officers
Chief information officers
British Army brigadiers
Military personnel from Staffordshire